Askerton is a civil parish in the Carlisle district of Cumbria, England.  It contains eight listed buildings that are recorded in the National Heritage List for England.  Of these, one is listed at Grade I, the highest of the three grades, and the others are at Grade II, the lowest grade.  The parish includes the village of Kirkcambeck and is otherwise rural.  The major building in the parish is Askerton Castle, a fortified house; this and buildings associated with it are listed.  The other listed buildings are the Anglican parish church of St Kentigern, houses, one of which is a ruin, and a reconstructed arch.


Key

Buildings

References

Citations

Sources

Lists of listed buildings in Cumbria